Buntingville is an unincorporated community in Lassen County, California. It is located just northwest of Honey Lake.

Buntingville is the southern terminus of County Route A3 (Standish Buntingville Road) at its junction with U.S. 395.

A.J. Bunting opened a general store at the site in 1878. A post office operated in Buntingville from 1883 to 1884, from 1899 to 1907, and from 1915 to 1920.

References

External links
 Buntingville on california.hometownlocator.com

Unincorporated communities in California
Unincorporated communities in Lassen County, California